Caution Point is a headland  northeast of Mount Birks, on the north side of the entrance to Spillane Fjord, which marks the east end of Austa Ridge that forms the north wall of Crane Glacier, on the east coast of Graham Land. It was photographed from the air by Sir Hubert Wilkins on a flight of December 20, 1928, and named by the Falkland Islands Dependencies Survey who charted it in 1947.

References 

Headlands of Graham Land
Oscar II Coast